Pilot Butte may refer to:

Pilot Butte, Saskatchewan, a town in Canada
Pilot Butte (Oregon), an extinct volcano in the United States
 Pilot Butte (Wyoming), a butte in the United States
Camp Pilot Butte, a historic place in Wyoming associated with the Rock Springs massacre
 Pilot Butte Dam, Wyoming, United States

See also
 Pilot Hill (disambiguation)
 Pilot Knob (disambiguation)
 Pilot Mountain (disambiguation)
 Pilot Peak (disambiguation)